Interleukin 21 receptor is a type I cytokine receptor. IL21R is its human gene.

The protein encoded by this gene is a cytokine receptor for interleukin 21 (IL21). It belongs to the type I cytokine receptors, and has been shown to form a heterodimeric receptor complex with the common gamma chain (γc), a receptor subunit also shared by the receptors for interleukin 2 (IL2), interleukin 7 (IL7) and interleukin 15 (IL15). This receptor transduces the growth promoting signal of IL21, and is important for the proliferation and differentiation of T cells, B cells, and natural killer (NK) cells. The ligand binding of this receptor leads to the activation of multiple downstream signaling molecules, including JAK1, JAK3, STAT1, and STAT3. Knockout studies of a similar gene in mouse suggest a role for this gene in regulating immunoglobulin production. Three alternatively spliced transcript variants encoding the same protein have been described.

References

Further reading

Type I cytokine receptors